Iyobosa Rehoboth, also known as Prodigeezy, is a Nigerian music video director and cinematographer.

Early life
Rehoboth hails from Edo State in Nigeria. He grew up in Port Harcourt, Nigeria.

Career
Prodigeezy has directed numerous music videos for recording artists across various genres, including controversial song by Falz "This Is Nigeria",
Killin’ Dem by Burna Boy, Don't Call me back by Joeboy, Joey B, Falz, Ric Hassani, among others.

Selected videography
Burna Boy ft Zlatan - Killin Dem 
Burna Boy - Boshe Nlo
Falz-This Is Nigeria
Falz-Talk
Falz-Hypocrite
Falz-Moral instruction 
Falz-Sweet Boy
GuiltyBeatz ft Joey B, Falz - Iyabo
Joeboy- Don't Call me back
Ric Hassani- Number one
Chef 187 ft Mr. P – One more time

Awards and nominations
In 2018 he won Best Music Video of the Year (Director) by Nigeria Entertainment Awards for his project This Is Nigeria.

In 2019 he was nominated for Best Music Video of the Year (Director) by The Headies for his project "Talk".

See also
 List of Nigerian cinematographers

References

External links
 
Prodigeezy on Instagram

Living people
Nigerian cinematographers
Nigerian music video directors
1994 births